Maculonaclia florida is a moth of the subfamily Arctiinae. It was described by Joseph de Joannis in 1906. It is found on Mauritius.

References

 

Arctiinae
Moths described in 1906